Sara A. Solla is an Argentine-American physicist and neuroscientist whose research applies ideas from statistical mechanics to problems involving neural networks, machine learning, and neuroscience. She is a professor of physics and of physiology at Northwestern University.

Education and career
Solla is originally from Buenos Aires, and earned a licenciatura in physics in 1974 from the University of Buenos Aires. She completed a Ph.D. in physics in 1982 at the University of Washington.

She became a postdoctoral researcher at Cornell University and at the Thomas J. Watson Research Center of IBM Research. Influenced to work in neural networks by a talk from John Hopfield at Cornell, she became a researcher in the neural networks group at Bell Labs. She took her present position at Northwestern University in 1997.

Recognition
Solla is a Member of the American Academy of Arts and Sciences (AAAS), and a Fellow of the American Physical Society (APS), Division of Biological Physics, "for applications of statistical physics to problems concerning learning, adaptation, and information coding in neural systems".

References

External links

Year of birth missing (living people)
Living people
Argentine physicists
Argentine women physicists
American physicists
American women physicists
University of Buenos Aires alumni
University of Washington alumni
Scientists at Bell Labs
Northwestern University faculty
Fellows of the American Physical Society
21st-century American women